The Polesskoe offensive (Russian: Полесская наступательная операция, Polesskaya nastupatelnaya operatsiya), also known as the Battle of Kovel, was a Soviet offensive operation, launched by the 2nd Belorussian Front at the junction of Army Group South and Army Group Center, with the goal to strike deep into the flank and the rear of Army Group Center. It was part of a greater Dnieper-Carpathian strategic offensive on the right-bank Ukraine.

The offensive started out successfully, with the Red Army forces penetrating the German defenses in depth and pushing them back towards the then Polish city of Kovel, a key town declared to be a fortress (Festung) by the Germans, which was encircled by Soviet units on the 18th of March 1944.

The German High Command, recognizing the danger to the rear of Army Group Center and the possible consequences of the fall of Kovel Garrison, took energetic measures to reinforce this sector. All told, between March–April 1944, the Germans transferred 9 divisions (including 2 panzer), 1 heavy panzer battalion and 2 StuG Assault Gun brigades from the main front of Army Group Center to its far right flank located deep in the rear of the army group, as well as 1 panzer division from Poland.

A Kampfgruppe of the 5th SS-Panzer-Division Wiking under SS-Obersturmführer Karl Nicolussi-Leck, which consisted of 17 panthers and a bergepanther, along with an infantry battalion from SS-Panzergrenadier-Regiment Germania, set out to save Kovel. After sustaining several losses, 7 panthers reached the Kovel defenders. On the 4th of April, more reinforcements arrived, breaking the encirclement. Thanks to these reinforcements, the Kovel Garrison was de-blockaded by the German relief forces on the 5th of April, with Soviet forces being pushed back to the outskirts of Kovel, after which the front-lines stabilized. The trapped German forces began to withdraw on the 10th of April.

As a result of the operation, Soviet troops, in conditions of wooded and marshy terrain and muddy roads, advanced 30–40 km to the west, crossed the Stokhod and Turya rivers and advanced to the approaches of the towns of Ratno, Kovel, Turiysk. On the right wing, the forces of the 2nd Belorussian Front cleared the southern coast of Pripyat river from the German forces for a considerable distance. However, the Germans managed to keep in their hands the cities of Turov, Stolin, David-Gorodok. The poorly prepared attempt of the 47th Army to seize Kovel, a small Volyn town, but at the same time an important transport hub, which in the course of the battle suddenly acquired almost strategic importance, was ultimately unsuccessful. The Germans, on the contrary, managed to achieve a small, but important tactical victory, which stood out against the background of a whole series of heavy defeats suffered by Army Group South around the same time during the same Dnieper-Carpathian Offensive. As a result, of the 10 offensive operations during the winter-spring of 1944 in the Ukraine, which comprised the Dnieper-Carpathian Offensive, the Polesskoe Offensive was the only one that did not achieve its goals.

References

Conflicts in 1944
Battles and operations of the Soviet–German War
1944 in Poland
Kovel